The SCE-200, also referred as Semi-Cryogenic Engine, is a 2 MN thrust class liquid rocket engine, being developed to power India's future heavy and super heavy lift launch vehicles. It is being developed by Liquid Propulsion Systems Centre of Indian Space Research Organisation and is expected to have first flight in 2020s.

Burning liquid oxygen (LOX) and RP-1 kerosene in an oxidizer-rich staged combustion cycle

, the engine will boost payload capacity of India's existing LVM3 replacing current L110 stage powered by 2 Vikas engines. It is also expected to power ISRO's upcoming NGLV rockets (previously planned as ULV) as well as ISRO's future reusable rockets based on RLV technology demonstrations.

The engine in September 2019 reportedly had become ready to begin testing in Ukraine and enter service no earlier than 2022. The use of engine of India's first human spaceflight, hence was ruled out by ISRO. By November 2022, SCE-200 had neared completion of its qualification tests. Stage and development had been complete and a facility to test it at ISRO Propulsion Complex Mahendergiri was getting ready for ground tests.

Background
On June 2, 2005, India and Ukraine signed the Framework Agreement between the Government of Ukraine and the Government of the Republic of India on Cooperation in the Peaceful Uses of Outer Space, which would enter in force on February 15, 2006. As per unconfirmed information obtained by WikiLeaks this contract involved the transfer of blueprints for a rocket engine by the Yuzhnoye Design Office. The engine blue prints supposedly transferred by Ukraine to India, have been identified as the RD-810 which in turn is a variant of Russian RD-120.

According to official press release on March 26, 2013, by Ukrainian Ministry of Economic Development and Trade, development of a rocket engine for Indian launch vehicles initiated in 2006 under a joint Indian-Ukrainian project named “Jasmine”

Development

During May and June 2015, ISRO and Roscosmos signed a wide-ranging Memorandum of Understanding for cooperation in space. A. S. Kiran Kumar, Chairman of the ISRO, stated that one of the first benefits would be the availability of Russian test stand for initial testing of the SCE-200, while the Mahendragiri semi-cryogenic test stand being built. The engine is a part of the  semi-cryogenic launch vehicle program, which would be capable of placing  in GTO. The engine however will not be the part of first flight of Gaganyaan, India's first manned mission to space, given timelines and schedules.

In 2017, Ukrainian firm Yuzhmash was contracted by ISRO to conduct tests on critical components of SCE-200. First stage of contract was reportedly complete and tests were expected to be completed by 2019. In April 2022, ISRO chairman Somanath stated that tests within the country were to begin in next 3 months. By November 2022, the test facility and stand had been nearly ready for engine as well as SC120 stage test which would upgrade India's existing LVM3 rocket.

See also
 Liquid Propulsion Systems Centre
 Yuzhnoye Design Office
 Geosynchronous Satellite Launch Vehicle Mk III
 RLV-TD Reusable Launch Vehicle Technology Demonstration
 Unified Launch Vehicle
 RD-120 – Russian rocket engine on which the SCE-200 is supposedly based.
 RD-810 – Ukrainian rocket engine with very similar characteristics.
 RD-170

References

Rocket engines of India
Rocket engines using kerosene propellant
Rocket engines using the staged combustion cycle